Kurukshetra is a 2019 Indian Kannada-language mythological war film written by J. K. Bharavi and directed by Naganna. The story is based on the epic poem Gadhayuddha by Ranna, which itself is based on the Indian epic Mahabharata. The story is centred on Duryodhana, the Kaurava king. The film was produced by Munirathna.

The film features an ensemble cast including Darshan, Ambareesh (his final role), V. Ravichandran, P. Ravishankar, Arjun Sarja, Meghana Raj, Sneha, Sonu Sood, Danish Akhtar Saifi, Nikhil Kumar, Haripriya and Shashikumar, portraying characters from Mahabharata. The score and soundtrack for the film is composed by V. Harikrishna whilst it has cinematography by Jayanan Vincent.

The film was released on 9 August 2019 across more than 1000 screens, making it the widest release for any Kannada film alongside the dubbed Telugu version. On 15 August, the Tamil version was released. The Malayalam-language version was released on 18 October in Kerala. It was the highest-grossing kannada film of 2019  and one of the highest-grossing Kannada films.

Plot

The story is a reinterpretation of the war described in the Mahabharata Sanskrit epic, from Duryodhana's viewpoint. After losing to the Kauravas in a gamble, the Pandavas go into exile and endure hardship for a number of years. Upon their return, conflict arises over the dynastic succession leading to a war.

Cast

Production
The official launch of the film was held on 6 August 2017 with filming beginning on the same day. A major portion of the film was shot at Ramoji Film City in Hyderabad. The film was shot twice, first in 2D format and then in 3D, with shooting completed after more than 230 days. A few scenes and dialogues were reported to have been inspired by the 1977 Telugu movie Daana Veera Soora Karna.

Soundtrack 

Music director V. Harikrishna was commissioned to compose the film's score. Lahari Music, which bagged the film's audio rights for 1.5 crore, launched the soundtrack on 7 July 2019. The first song, "Saahore Saaho", was released on 5 July 2019.

Kannada Tracklist

Hindi Tracklist

Telugu Tracklist

Tamil Tracklist

Malayalam Tracklist

Release

Home media
The satellite rights for the Kannada and Hindi versions of the film were bought by two different companies for 9 crore and 9.5 crore, respectively.

Release date allocation
A news report in late-2018 speculated that the film would be released in February 2019. But a delay caused the release date to be pushed to 5 April, targeting a Ugadi release. After actor Nikhil Kumar announced his participation in the 2019 Indian general elections, the release date was further postponed as promotion of a candidate is prohibited during the elections. Producer Munirathna remarked, "The film is made in both 2D and 3D and it has got delayed due to the extensive graphics. Now, we are ready with the product and as planned, I am very keen to release this in April first week. But since Nikhil is part of our film, if I want to go ahead with the planned release date, I will have to lose out the entire Mysuru region." The film was later slated to be released on 9 August but pulled forward by a week in order to avoid a clash in screen allotment with another multi-language release Saaho. Later it was rescheduled to 9 August to coincide with the festival of Varamahalakshmi Vrata.

The film was planned to be simultaneously released in four languages, apart from Kannada. The film was released on 9 August 2019 in both 2D and 3D formats in two languages – Kannada and Telugu. On 15 August 2019, the Tamil version was released. Due to floods in Kerala, the Malayalam version was released in the 18 October 2019. The Hindi version hit the theatres on 20 December 2019.

On 5 September 2019, the film was released in the Middle East countries of United Arab Emirates, Bahrain, Oman, Kuwait, and Qatar.

References

External links
 

2019 films
Films based on the Mahabharata
Indian epic films
Films scored by V. Harikrishna
Indian biographical films
Hindu mythological films
2010s Kannada-language films
Films shot at Ramoji Film City
Indian historical action films
Hindu devotional films
Indian 3D films
2019 3D films
Rockline Entertainments films
2010s biographical films
Films directed by Naganna